Bifrenaria inodora is a species of orchid.

inodora|inodora